Vernon - Giverny (before 2014: Vernon) is a railway station serving the town Vernon, Eure department, northwestern France. It is situated on the Paris–Le Havre railway.

Services

The station is served by regional trains to Rouen and Paris.

References

External links
 

Railway stations in Eure
Railway stations in France opened in 1843